Gregory Lloyd Campbell (born 15 February 1953) is a British politician who has been the Democratic Unionist Party (DUP) Member of Parliament (MP) for East Londonderry since 2001.

He was previously a Member of the Northern Ireland Assembly (MLA) for East Londonderry, from 1998 to 2016. In May 2021, Campbell 
was a candidate alongside Paula Bradley for the position as Deputy Leader of the DUP, following the resignation of the Nigel Dodds; he was unsuccessful in getting elected.

Early life
Campbell was born and raised in the Waterside area of Derry as an only child. He was educated at the city's technical college and at the University of Ulster.

Political career
He joined the DUP in the 1970s and was first elected to Londonderry City Council in 1981. Campbell briefly led the local DUP members out of the council in 1984 when it changed its name to Derry City Council, although he returned to his seat not long after. He stood down in 2011 after 30 years as a councillor.

He was chosen to contest the Foyle constituency in the general election of 1983. He contested the same seat again in the general elections of 1987 and 1992, although each time he finished second behind Social Democratic and Labour Party leader John Hume.

He appeared in the BBC Real Lives documentary At the Edge of the Union, which was temporarily blocked in August 1985 by direct government intervention from the then Home Secretary, Leon Brittan. This led to a one-day strike by the National Union of Journalists to defend the independence of the BBC.

That same year, in an extensive interview with Magill magazine, Campbell outlined his opposition to homosexuality, telling journalist Fintan O'Toole: "It's an evil, wicked, abhorrent practice. My opposition to that is based on the Bible and also based on natural justice and I know many people who do not share my Protestant faith but who would share my opposition to homosexuality because they believe it is something which would corrupt society as a whole and is something so radically awful as to merit total and utter opposition. You're not even talking about something which is a run of the mill sexual practice but something which is totally and utterly depraved, and to me anyway the AIDS scare which is currently running through America is proof that homosexual practice is something which calls upon the curse of God."

Given that Foyle had a predominantly nationalist population, the increasingly high-profile Campbell was transferred to the more winnable East Londonderry seat, where he ran unsuccessfully in 1997. Campbell won the seat at his second attempt in the 2001 general election, gaining a majority of 1,901 over sitting MP William Ross of the Ulster Unionist Party. He was re-elected in the 2005 general election, this time securing an increased majority of 7,498 over the new UUP candidate David McClarty. Until 2016, he was also a member of the Northern Ireland Assembly, topping the East Londonderry poll (from which six members are elected) in the elections of 1998, 2003, 2007 and 2011.

Government and subsequent activity
Campbell was appointed Minister of Regional Development in the Northern Ireland Executive in July 2000. On 9 June 2008, Campbell took over the Department of Culture, Arts and Leisure, replacing Edwin Poots, following a reshuffle of the DUP's ministerial team by newly appointed First Minister Peter Robinson. He was replaced in this role by party colleague Nelson McCausland following another reshuffle on 22 June 2009 and the announcement by Peter Robinson that DUP politicians would no longer hold office in the Assembly and serve as MPs at Westminster simultaneously.

In October 2008, Campbell spoke out against the American cartoon The Simpsons, after the Sex, Pies and Idiot Scrapes episode showed a fight between nationalists and unionists. The episode also featured references to the IRA. Campbell said, "The Simpsons is a humorous cartoon but the context of using a line like that about an organisation which caused so much death will lead people to have very mixed views."

In December 2008, Campbell criticised the singer Dido for her song "Let's Do the Things We Normally Do", which referenced lyrics from a song, "The Men Behind the Wire". The original song had been written in response to internment in Northern Ireland and Campbell suggested that Dido "should clarify her position so that her fans and the wider public knows where she stands on these things".

In 2009, Campbell declared his support for capital punishment in "some cases" during a Westminster Parliament debate.

In 2011 a man was convicted and was given a suspended jail sentence and fined after posting a menacing message on Facebook about Campbell. In February 2012, Campbell voiced opposition to the redrawing of the electoral borders in Northern Ireland, stating that they "will have a detrimental effect on the north west." Campbell supports a number of evangelical Protestant groups including a creationist lobby group, the Caleb Foundation.

He has been critical of some Twitter comments by Derry-born footballer James McClean and condemned McClean's decision not to wear a poppy on his shirt in the buildup to Remembrance Sunday in 2012. McClean, who played for Sunderland at the time, had stated on Twitter that his favourite song was "The Broad Black Brimmer" by the republican folk group The Wolfe Tones. Campbell commented, "I've been watching him closely and knew he would slip up sooner or later." Subsequently, McClean was banned from using Twitter from his club. Campbell was offered an invitation to a Wolfe Tones concert, which he declined.

In March 2013, Campbell made a successful parliamentary motion to stop a one-off concept car made by the motor company Kia from ever going into production. The show car was unveiled at the Geneva Motor Show and was named "Provo" after the Italian word Prova, meaning trial or test. He put forward a motion at the House of Commons to stop any possible development of the car, due to the connotations the name might have in Ireland ("Provos" is a common shortened form of Provisional IRA), although the car was never intended to go into production. A spokesperson for Kia said in a statement it would be certain not to market any future car as a "Provo" in the United Kingdom or the Republic of Ireland, adding: "This car is a showcase, it's a little bit of frivolity, it's for a motor show in Switzerland designed by an Italian at a design studio in Frankfurt."

In November 2014, Campbell became embroiled in a controversy after parodying the Irish language while addressing the Northern Ireland Assembly. Mocking the nationalist MLAs' tradition of beginning addressing the Assembly with the Irish words "go raibh maith agat, Ceann Comhairle" ("thank you, Speaker"), he opened a question about minority language policy saying "curry my yoghurt, can coca coalyer", an anglicised corruption of the Irish. Campbell was unwilling to apologise, and was temporarily censured. He said at the DUP's annual conference later that month: "On behalf of our party let me say clearly, and slowly so that Caitríona Ruane and Gerry Adams understand, we will never agree to an Irish Language Act at Stormont and we will treat their entire wish list as no more than toilet paper."

In March 2019, Campbell was one of 21 MPs who voted against LGBT inclusive sex and relationship education in English schools.

In February 2021, Campbell was urged by anti-racism organisations to apologise after describing, on Facebook, an edition of Songs of Praise that featured only black people as the "BBC at its BLM worst." Campbell wrote: "There were five singers, all of them black. There were three judges all of them black and one presenter who was incidentally, yes black. The singers were all very good but can you imagine an all white line up with an all white jury and presented by a white person? No I can't either."

Campbell is one of three DUP MPs on a list of journalists, military figures and MPs on list along with staff from most major British newspapers and broadcasters banned by the Russian authorities in June 2022, as a response to western sanctions and the “spreading of false information about Russia”, as well as “anti-Russian actions of the British government”.

References

External links
 
 Guardian Unlimited Politics – Ask Aristotle: Gregory Campbell MP
 Northern Ireland Assembly – Gregory Campbell MLA
 Londonderry DUP profile – Gregory Campbell MP
 Maiden Speech : House of Commons – 26 June 2001

1953 births
Living people
Politicians from County Londonderry
Alumni of Ulster University
Northern Ireland MPAs 1982–1986
Members of the Northern Ireland Forum
Ministers of the Northern Ireland Executive (since 1999)
Democratic Unionist Party MLAs
Northern Ireland MLAs 1998–2003
Northern Ireland MLAs 2003–2007
Northern Ireland MLAs 2007–2011
Northern Ireland MLAs 2011–2016
Presbyterians from Northern Ireland
Democratic Unionist Party MPs
Members of the Parliament of the United Kingdom for County Londonderry constituencies (since 1922)
UK MPs 2001–2005
UK MPs 2005–2010
UK MPs 2010–2015
UK MPs 2015–2017
UK MPs 2017–2019
UK MPs 2019–present
Ulster Protestants
Ulster Scots people
Christian creationists